Swingers is a Dutch romantic drama film released in 2002 and tells the story of a thirty-something couple Diana and Julian and their experiment in swinging. The film was written, produced and directed by Stephan Brenninkmeijer. It was a controversial low-budget production that was released in the Netherlands (in October 2002) and Belgium (in February 2003) and sold internationally.

Synopsis
A psychological portrait of relationships and sexual desire. Diana and her husband Julian have been together for some time. Despite Diana's insecurity, she agrees to experiment with another couple sexually for the first time. They post an advertisement on the internet, to which Alex and Timo respond. Diana and Julian invite the other couple over to Diana's parents' ultra-modern house (the parents are absent) for a weekend. 

Alex and Timo are confident swingers, especially gorgeous Alex, whose ravishing sexiness and confident sexuality intimidates quiet Diana, about whom it is hinted that the house holds unhappy childhood memories. However, Timo seems strangely uninterested. But once night falls and their sexual exploration begins the relationships are put to the test.

Cast
 Ellen van der Koogh as Diana
 Dan de Kok as Julian
 Nienke Brinkhuis as Alex
 Joep Sertons as Timo

Release
The film had a modest release, therefore didn't do too well at the Dutch box office but did well on the DVD/Video circuit.
Since the producer put the film on YouTube for free, it garnered more than 30 million views (as of December 2020).  The movie has since been removed for violating YouTube's policy on nudity or sexual content.

References

External links
 
 Official filmsite

2002 films
2002 drama films
Dutch drama films
2000s Dutch-language films